Dromcolliher-Broadford is a parish bordering north Cork in County Limerick, Ireland.
There are two villages within the parish, Dromcolliher and Broadford.

Dromcolliher (Drom Collachair in Irish) is a small Irish town towards the west of County Limerick. It is part of the parish of Dromcollogher-Broadford (previously known as Killagholehane). It is also very close to the boundary of north Cork on the R522 road from Newcastle West to Liscarroll/Buttevant, County Cork. 
Broadford ( - "the Mouth of the Ford") is located in the west of County Limerick. It is part of the Roman Catholic parish of Dromcollogher-Broadford. In the 2006 Irish census, the resident population of the Broadford electoral district was 891.

According to records, the village is relatively new, and was first recorded by cartographers in 1837. Prior to its current name, it was known as "Killaliathan" or "Killagholehane". This name derives from Killaliathan Church, a nearby medieval church now partially ruined.

Townlands

References

External links
 2006 Census data from the Central Statistics Office
 Dromcollogher / Broadford. Parish - Roman Catholic Diocese of Limerick
 Broadford, Co. Limerick, at the Placenames Database of Ireland

Towns and villages in County Limerick